The 2018 IMSA SportsCar Championship was the 48th motor racing championship sanctioned by the International Motor Sports Association (IMSA) (which traces its lineage to the 1971 IMSA GT Championship). It was the fifth season of the United SportsCar Championship and third to be held under the name as the WeatherTech SportsCar Championship. It began on January 27 with the 24 Hours of Daytona, and ended on October 13 with the Petit Le Mans.

Series News 

 2018 was the final season Fox Sports televised the series, NBC Sports Group becomes the series' broadcaster, starting in 2019.
 2018 was also the final season Continental Tire provided tires for competitors.

Classes

 Prototype (P)
 GT Le Mans (GTLM)
 GT Daytona (GTD)

At the end of 2017 season, the Prototype Challenge (PC) class was reduced to a support series.

Schedule

Race schedule

The 2018 schedule was released on August 4, 2017 and featured twelve rounds.

Calendar changes

The Circuit of the Americas was removed from the calendar, and replaced by a round at Mid-Ohio Sports Car Course.
The GTD was removed from Long Beach due to space limitations.
A non-championship round was held at Sebring in November 2018 with IMSA's 2019 rules for the GTD class, along with LMP3, GS, and TCR classes in the secondary series. This saw Michelin's debut as the 2019 series specification tire supplier.

Entries

Prototype
The Prototype class is made up of LMP2 cars both in LMP2 trim, with the ACO specification Gibson V8 engine, and in Daytona Prototype International (DPi) trim, where manufacturers are allowed to use  their own engines and bodykits, designed to reflect the automaker's design language. Acura (Oreca), Mazda (Riley Technologies), Cadillac (Dallara), and Nissan (Onroak Automotive) will run chassis from the respective constructors featuring manufacturer-specific bodywork and engines.

GT Le Mans

GT Daytona

Notes

Race results
Bold indicates overall winner.

Championship standings

Points systems
Championship points are awarded in each class at the finish of each event. Points are awarded based on finishing positions as shown in the chart below.

Drivers points
Points are awarded in each class at the finish of each event.

Team points
Team points are calculated in exactly the same way as driver points, using the point distribution chart. Each car entered is considered its own "team" regardless if it is a single entry or part of a two-car team.

Manufacturer points
There are also a number of manufacturer championships which utilize the same season-long point distribution chart. The manufacturer championships recognized by IMSA are as follows:

Prototype (P): Engine manufacturer
GT Le Mans (GTLM): Car manufacturer
GT Daytona (GTD): Car manufacturer

Each manufacturer receives finishing points for its highest finishing car in each class. The positions of subsequent finishing cars from the same manufacturer are not taken into consideration, and all other manufacturers move up in the order.

Example: Manufacturer A finishes 1st and 2nd at an event, and Manufacturer B finishes 3rd. Manufacturer A receives 35 first-place points while Manufacturer B would earn 32 second-place points.

North American Endurance Cup
The points system for the North American Endurance Cup is different from the normal points system. Points are awarded on a 5-4-3-2 basis for drivers, teams and manufacturers. The first finishing position at each interval earns five points, four points for second position, three points for third, with two points awarded for fourth and each subsequent finishing position.

At Daytona (24 hour race), points are awarded at six hours, 12 hours, 18 hours and at the finish. At the Sebring (12 hour race), points are awarded at four hours, eight hours and at the finish. At Watkins Glen (6 hour race), points are awarded at three hours and at the finish. At Road Atlanta (10 hour race), points are awarded at four hours, eight hours and at the finish.

Like the season-long team championship, North American Endurance Cup team points are awarded for each car and drivers get points in any car that they drive, in which they are entered for points. The manufacturer points go to the highest placed car from that manufacturer (the others from that manufacturer not being counted), just like the season-long manufacturer championship.

For example: in any particular segment manufacturer A finishes 1st and 2nd and manufacturer B finishes 3rd. Manufacturer A only receives first-place points for that segment. Manufacturer B receives the second-place points.

Drivers' championships

Prototype

GT Le Mans

GT Daytona

Notes
1 – Relegated to last in class for exceeding maximum driver time.

Team's Championships

Prototype

GT Le Mans

GT Daytona

Notes
1 – Relegated to last in class for exceeding maximum driver time.

Manufacturers' championships

Prototype

GT Le Mans

GT Daytona

References

 
WeatherTech SportsCar Championship seasons
WeatherTech SportsCar Championship